John Ian McLaughlin (born 3 January 1948) is a Scottish former professional footballer who played as a left back. Active in Scotland, England and the United States between 1967 and 1977, McLaughlin made 217 career League appearances for three clubs, scoring 13 goals.

Career
Born in Stirling, McLaughlin played junior football with Gowanhill United. He turned professional in 1967 with Falkirk of the Scottish Football League, spending four seasons with the club before moving to Everton of the English Football League. After five seasons with Everton, McLaughlin spent a season in the North American Soccer League with the Seattle Sounders, before returning to first club Falkirk for a final season.

References

External links

NASL career stats
Everton F.C. profile

1948 births
Living people
Scottish footballers
Falkirk F.C. players
Everton F.C. players
Seattle Sounders (1974–1983) players
Scottish Football League players
English Football League players
North American Soccer League (1968–1984) players
Association football fullbacks
Footballers from Stirling
Scottish expatriate footballers
Expatriate soccer players in the United States
Scottish expatriate sportspeople in the United States